JCQ may refer to:

 The JCQ, a British rock band
 John Callahan's Quads!
 Joint Council for Qualifications